Major military efforts were taken by Kublai Khan of the Yuan dynasty in 1274 and 1281 to conquer the Japanese archipelago after the submission of the Korean kingdom of Goryeo to vassaldom. Ultimately a failure, the invasion attempts are of macro-historical importance because they set a limit on Mongol expansion and rank as nation-defining events in the history of Japan. The invasions are referred to in many works of fiction and are the earliest events for which the word kamikaze ("divine wind") is widely used, originating in reference to the two typhoons faced by the Yuan fleets.

The invasions were one of the earliest cases of gunpowder warfare outside of China. One of the most notable technological innovations during the war was the use of explosive, hand-thrown bombs.

Background

After a series of Mongol invasions of Korea between 1231 and 1281, Goryeo signed a treaty in favor of the Mongols and became a vassal state. Kublai was declared Khagan of the Mongol Empire in 1260 (although that was not widely recognized by the Mongols in the west) and established his capital at Khanbaliq (within modern Beijing) in 1264.

Japan was then ruled by the Shikken (shogunate regents) of the Hōjō clan, who had intermarried with and wrested control from Minamoto no Yoriie, shōgun of the Kamakura shogunate, after his death in 1203. The inner circle of the Hōjō clan had become so pre-eminent that they no longer consulted the council of the shogunate, the Imperial Court of Kyoto, or their gokenin vassals, and they made their decisions at private meetings in their residences.

The Mongols also made attempts to subjugate the native peoples of Sakhalin, the Ainu and Nivkh peoples, from 1264 to 1308. However, it is doubtful if Mongol activities in Sakhalin were part of the effort to invade Japan.

Contact

In 1266, Kublai Khan dispatched emissaries to Japan demanding for Japan to become a vassal and send tribute under a threat of conflict.

The letter stated:

In 1267, Kublai Khan's ministers sent another letter to Goryeo to be transmitted to Japan:

From 1266 to 1273, a diplomatic mission composed of Mongols and Goryeos sent envoys to Japan six times to demand submission to the Mongols, but the Japanese continued to ignore the demands. Japan took seriously the letter brought by the second diplomatic mission to Japan in 1268 as an omen of invasion, ordered Shinto shrines and Buddhist temples to pray for the repulsion of foreign troops, and began to fortify its defenses in Kyushu.

First invasion preparations

The invasion fleet was scheduled to depart in the seventh lunar month of 1274 but was delayed for three months. Kublai planned for the fleet to first attack Tsushima Island and Iki Island before making landfall in Hakata Bay. The Japanese plan of defense was simply to contest them at every point with gokenin. Both Yuan and Japanese sources exaggerate the opposing side's numbers, with the History of Yuan putting the Japanese at 102,000, and the Japanese claiming they were outnumbered at least ten to one. In reality, there are no reliable records of the size of Japanese forces, but estimates put their total numbers at around 4,000 to 6,000. The Yuan invasion force was composed of 15,000 Mongol, Han Chinese, and Jurchen soldiers, 6,000 to 8,000 Korean troops, and  7,000 Korean sailors.

First invasion (1274)

Invasion of Tsushima 
The Yuan invasion forces set off from Hoppo (now Masan, South Gyeongsang Province, Korea) on 2 November 1274 (Dōngyuè 5 in the Chinese calendar). Two days later they began landing on Tsushima Island. The principal landing was made at Komoda beach near Sasuura, on the northwestern tip of the southern island of Shimono. Additional landings occurred in the strait between the two islands of Tsushima, as well as at two points on the northern island of Kamino. The following description of events is based on contemporary Japanese sources, notably the Sō Shi Kafu, a history of the Sō clan of Tsushima.

At Sasuura, the invasion fleet was spotted offshore, allowing the deputy governor (jitodai) Sō Sukekuni (1207–74) to organize a hasty defense. On that day, the shrine to Hachiman caught fire, which would have been an omen of bad luck, but Sukekuni interpreted it as an omen of warning.

With eighty mounted samurai and their retinue, Sukekuni confronted an invasion force of what the Sō Shi Kafu describes as 8000 warriors embarked on 900 ships. The Mongols landed at 02:00 in the morning on 4 November, and ignored the Japanese negotiation attempts, shooting with their archers and forcing them to retreat. The fight was engaged by 04:00. The small garrison force was quickly defeated, but according to the Sō Shi Kafu, one samurai, Sukesada, cut down 25 enemy soldiers in individual combat. The invaders defeated a final Japanese cavalry charge around nightfall.

After their victory at Komoda, the Yuan forces burnt down most of the buildings around Sasuura and slaughtered most of the inhabitants. They took the next few days to secure control of Tsushima.

Invasion of Iki 
The Yuan fleet departed Tsushima on 13 November and attacked Iki Island. Like Sukekuni, Taira no Kagetaka, the governor of Iki, gave a spirited defence with 100 samurai and the local armed populace before falling back to his castle by nightfall. The next morning, Yuan forces had surrounded the castle. Kagetaka sent his daughter with a trusted samurai, Sōzaburō, on a secret passage to the shore, where they boarded a ship and fled for the mainland. A passing Mongol fleet shot arrows at them and killed the daughter but Sōzaburō managed to reach Hakata Bay and report Iki's defeat.

Kagetaka made a final failed sortie with 36 men, 30 of whom died in battle, before committing suicide with his family. According to the Japanese, the Mongols then held down the women and stabbed them through their palms with knives, stripped them naked, and tied their corpses to the sides of their ships.

Landing in Hakata Bay 
The Yuan fleet crossed the sea and landed in Hakata Bay on 19 November, a short distance from Dazaifu, the ancient administrative capital of Kyūshū. The following day brought the Battle of Bun'ei (文永の役), also known as the "First Battle of Hakata Bay".

Conlan argues that the History of Yuan'''s account of the battle suggests that both the Japanese and Yuan forces were of similar size. Conlan estimates that both armies numbered around 3,000 each (not including the Yuan sailors) during this battle while Japanese historians estimate 6,000 defenders on the Japanese side. The Japanese forces, being inexperienced with non-Japanese tactics, found the Mongol army perplexing. The Yuan forces disembarked and advanced in a dense body protected by a screen of shields. They wielded their polearms in a tightly packed fashion with no space between them. As they advanced they also threw paper and iron casing bombs on occasion, frightening the Japanese horses and making them uncontrollable in battle. When the grandson of a Japanese commander shot an arrow to announce the beginning of battle, the Mongols burst out laughing.

The History of Yuan gives a similar but shorter account:

The battle lasted for only a day and the fighting, though fierce, was uncoordinated and brief. One low-ranking samurai, Takezaki Suenaga, received word from his commander Shōni Kagesuke that he was to wait until the Mongols advanced due to difficult terrain, but Takezaki attacked the Mongols anyway. On his way to the beach, he encountered Kikuchi Takefusa, who had already encountered a Yuan detachment, driven them away and killed two. Kikuchi told him the 'pirates' had already fled. Takezaki and his five companions charged the small Yuan detachment that Kikuchi had previously encountered, but their horses got stuck in the mud, and they were wounded by a barrage of arrows. Takezaki and three surviving retainers managed to retreat with the aid of Shiroishi Michiyasu, who charged the Yuan detachment and drove them away. By nightfall the Yuan invasion force had forced the Japanese off the beach with a third of the defending forces dead, driving them several kilometres inland, and burning Hakata.

The Japanese were preparing to make a last stand at Mizuki (water castle), an earthwork moat fort dating back to 664. However the Yuan attack never came. One of the three commanding Yuan generals, Liu Fuxiang (Yu-Puk Hyong), was shot in the face by the retreating samurai, Shōni Kagesuke, and seriously injured. Liu convened with the other generals Holdon and Hong Dagu back on his ship. Holdon wanted to keep advancing through the night before more Japanese reinforcements arrived but Hong was worried that their troops were too exhausted and needed rest. There was also fear of being ambushed in the night. Liu agreed with Hong and recalled the Yuan forces back to their ships.

 Disappearance of the invaders 
By morning, most of the Yuan ships had disappeared. According to a Japanese courtier in his diary entry for 6 November 1274, a sudden reverse wind from the east blew back the Yuan fleet. A few ships were beached and some 50 Yuan soldiers and sailors were captured and executed. According to the History of Yuan, "a great storm arose and many warships were dashed on the rocks and destroyed." It is not certain whether the storm occurred at Hakata or if the fleet had already set sail for Korea and encountered it on their way back. Some accounts offer casualty reports that suggest 200 ships were lost. Of the 30,000 strong invasion force, 13,500 did not return.

A story widely known in Japan is that back in Kamakura, Tokimune was overcome with fear when the invasion finally came and wanting to overcome his cowardice, he asked Mugaku Sogen, his Zen master, also known as Bukkō, for advice. Bukkō replied that he had to sit in meditation to find the source of his cowardice in himself. Tokimune went to Bukkō and said, "Finally there is the greatest happening of my life." Bukkō asked, "How do you plan to face it?" Tokimune screamed, "Katsu!" as if he wanted to scare all the enemies in front of him. Bukkō responded with satisfaction, "It is true that the son of a lion roars as a lion!" Since then, Tokimune was instrumental in spreading Zen and Bushido in Japan among the samurai.

Second invasion preparations

After the invasion of 1274, the shogunate made efforts to defend against a second invasion, which they thought was sure to come. In addition, a large number of stakes were driven into the mouth of the river and the expected landing sites to prevent the Mongol Army from landing.

Kublai Khan sent five Yuan emissaries in September 1275 to Kyūshū, who refused to leave without a reply. Tokimune responded by having them sent to Kamakura and then beheading them. The graves of those five executed Yuan emissaries still exist at Jōryū-ji, in Fujisawa, Kanagawa, near the Tatsunokuchi Execution Place in Kamakura. Five more Yuan emissaries were sent on 29 July 1279, in the same manner, and were again beheaded, this time in Hakata.

In the autumn of 1280, Kublai held a conference at his summer palaces to discuss plans for a second invasion of Japan. The major difference between the first and the second invasion was that the Yuan dynasty had finished conquering the Song dynasty in 1279 and was able to launch a two-pronged attack. The invading force was drawn from a number of sources, including criminals with commuted death sentences and even those mourning the loss of their parents, a serious affair in China. More than 1,500 ships were requisitioned for the invasion: 600 from Southern China, 900 from Korea. Reportedly 40,000 troops were amassed in Korea and 100,000 in Southern China. Those numbers are likely an exaggeration, but the addition of Southern Chinese resources probably meant the second invasion force was still several times larger than the first invasion. Nothing is known about the size of the Japanese forces.

Second invasion (1281)

 Attacks on Tsushima and Iki 
Orders for the second invasion came in the first lunar month of 1281. Two fleets were prepared, a force of 900 ships in Korea and 3,500 ships in Southern China with a combined force of 142,000 soldiers and sailors. The Mongol general Arakhan was named supreme commander of the operation and was to travel with the Southern Route fleet, which was under the command of Fan Wenhu but was delayed by supply difficulties.

The Eastern Route army set sail first from Korea on 22 May and attacked Tsushima on 9 June and Iki Island on 14 June. According to the History of Yuan, the Japanese commander Shōni Suketoki and Ryūzōji Suetoki led forces in the tens of thousands against the invasion force. The expeditionary forces discharged their firearms, and the Japanese were routed, with Suketoki killed in the process. More than 300 islanders were killed. The Yuan soldiers sought out the children and killed them as well. However, the History of Yuan merges events in June with the later battle in July, when Shōni Suketoki actually fell in battle.

 Landings in Nagato and Hakata Bay 

The Eastern Route army was supposed to wait for the Southern Route army at Iki, but their commanders, Hong Dagu and Kim Bang-gyeong, disobeyed orders and set out to invade Mainland Japan by themselves. They departed on 23 June, a full week ahead of the expected arrival of the Southern Route army on 2 July. The Eastern Route army split their forces in half and simultaneously attacked Hakata Bay and Nagato Province. Three hundred ships attacked Nagato on 25 June but were driven off and forced to return to Iki.

Meanwhile, the rest of the Eastern Route army attacked Hakata Bay, which was heavily fortified with a defensive wall. Some Mongol ships came ashore but were unable to make it past the defensive wall and were driven off by volleys of arrows.

 Japanese counterattacks and Mongol withdrawal 
Unable to land, the Mongol invasion force occupied the islands of Shika and Noko from which it had planned to launch raids against Hakata. Instead, the Japanese launched raids at night on board small ships. The Hachiman Gudōkun credit Kusano Jirō with boarding a Mongol ship, setting fire to it, and taking 21 heads.

The next day, Kawano Michiari led a daytime raid with just two boats. His uncle Michitoki was immediately killed by an arrow, and Michiari was wounded both in the shoulder and the left arm. However, upon boarding the enemy ship, he slew a large Mongol warrior for which he was made a hero and richly rewarded. Takezaki Suenaga was also among those who raided the Yuan fleet. Takezaki also participated in driving the Mongols from Shika island, although in that instance, he was wounded and forced them to withdraw to Iki on 30 June.

The Japanese defence of Hakata Bay is known as the Battle of Kōan. On 16 July, fighting commenced between the Japanese and Mongols at Iki Island, resulting in Mongol withdrawal to Hirado Island.

 Stalemate at Hakata 
After the Southern Route fleet convened with the Eastern Route fleet, the two fleets took some time rearranging themselves before they advanced on Taka island. After taking Taka island, the Yuan army advanced on Hakata. A two-week battle ensued throughout the countryside that entered a stalemate.

On 12 August, the Japanese repeated their small raids on the invasion fleet that lasted throughout the night. The Mongols responded by fastening their ships together with chains and planks to provide defensive platforms. There are no accounts of the raids from the Japanese side in this incident unlike at the defence of Hakata Bay. According to the History of Yuan, the Japanese ships were small and were all beaten off:

 Kamikaze and the end of the invasion 

On 15 August, a great typhoon, known in Japanese as kamikaze, struck the fleet at anchor from the west and devastated it. Sensing the oncoming typhoon, Korean and south Chinese mariners retreated and unsuccessfully docked in Imari Bay, where they were destroyed by the storm. Thousands of soldiers were left drifting on pieces of wood or washed ashore. The Japanese defenders killed all those they found except for the Southern Chinese, who they felt had been coerced into joining the attack on Japan.

According to a Chinese survivor, after the typhoon, Commander Fan Wenhu picked the best remaining ships and sailed away, leaving more than 100,000 troops to die. After being stranded for three days on Taka island, the Japanese attacked and captured tens of thousands. They were moved to Hakata where the Japanese killed all the Mongols, Koreans, and Northern Chinese. The Southern Chinese were spared but made slaves. According to a Korean source, of the 26,989 Koreans who set out with the Eastern Route fleet, 7,592 did not return. Chinese and Mongol sources indicate a casualty rate of 60 to 90 percent.

Size of the invasion
Many modern historians believe the figures for the invasion force to be exaggerated, as was common in post-classical chronicles. Thomas Conlan, from Princeton University, writes that they were likely exaggerated by an order of magnitude, implying 140,000 soldiers and sailors, and expresses skepticism that a medieval-era kingdom could have managed an invasion on the scale of D-Day during World War II, across over ten times the distance, and questions if even 10,000 soldiers attacked Japan in 1281.

Morris Rossabi writes that Conlan was correct in his assertion that the invasion force was much smaller than traditionally believed but argues that the expenditures lavished on the mission confirm that the fighting force was sizable and much larger than 10,000 soldiers and 4,000 sailors. He puts forward the alternative figure of 70,000 soldiers and sailors, half of what is stated in the Yuanshi and later Japanese claims.

Turnbull thinks that more than 140,000 is an exaggeration but does not offer his own precise estimate for the size of the army. Rather, he states only that given the contributions of the Southern Song, the second invasion should have been around three times larger than the first. As he earlier listed the common figure of 23,000 for the first invasion uncritically, unlike the estimate of more than 140,000 for the second, which would imply an invasion force of around 70,000, on par with Rossabbi's estimate.

 Aftermath 

The defeated Mongol Empire lost most of its naval power, and its naval defense capability declined significantly. Korea, which was in charge of shipbuilding for the invasion, also lost its ability to build ships and its ability to defend the sea since a large amount of lumber was cut down. On the other hand, in Japan there was no newly-acquired land because it was a defensive war and so the Kamakura shogunate could not give rewards to gokenin who participated in the battle, and its authority declined. Later, taking advantage of the situation, the number of Japanese joining the wokou began to increase, and attacks on the coasts of China and Korea intensified.

As a result of the war, there was a growing recognition in China that the Japanese were brave and violent and the invasion of Japan was futile. During the Ming Dynasty, invasion into Japan was discussed three times, but it was never carried out considering the result of this war.Michihiro Ishihara 新訂 旧唐書倭国日本伝・ 宋史日本伝・元史日本伝―中国正史日本伝〈2〉, pp.213-216. Iwanani bunko, 1986 

 Cultural influence 

The Zen Buddhism of Hōjō Tokimune and his Zen master Bukkō gained credibility beyond national boundaries, and the first mass followings of Zen teachings among samurai began to flourish.

The failed invasions also mark the first use of the word kamikaze ("Divine Wind").  The fact that the typhoon that helped Japan defeat the Mongol Navy in the first invasion occurred in late November, well after the normal Pacific typhoon season (May to October), perpetuated the Japanese belief that they would never be defeated or successfully invaded, which remained an important aspect of Japanese foreign policy until the very end of World War II. The failed invasions also demonstrated one of the Mongols' weaknesses – the inability to mount naval invasions successfully After the death of Kublai, his successor, Temür Khan, unsuccessfully demanded the submission of Japan in 1295.

Military significance
Bombs and cannons

The Mongol invasions are an early example of gunpowder warfare outside of China. One of the most notable technological innovations during the war was the use of explosive bombs. The bombs are known in Chinese as "thunder crash bombs" and were fired from catapults, inflicting damage on enemy soldiers. An illustration of a bomb is depicted in the Japanese Mongol Invasion scrolls, but Thomas Conlan has shown that the illustration of the projectiles was added to the scrolls in the 18th century and should not be considered to be an eyewitness representation of their use. However, archaeological discoveries since Conlan's statement have confirmed the existence of bombs in the Yuan invasion's arsenal. Multiple bomb shells were discovered in an underwater shipwreck off the shore of Japan by the Kyushu Okinawa Society for Underwater Archaeology. X-rays by Japanese scientists of the excavated shells show that they contained gunpowder and were also packed with scrap iron.

The Yuan forces may have also used cannons during the invasion. The Taiheiki mentions a weapon shaped like a bell that made a noise like thunder-clap and shot out thousands of iron balls.

 Japanese sword 
The yumi (longbow) and naginata were the main weapons of samurai in this period. Yumi is able to shoot while riding on horseback with the Japanese sword acting as a secondary weapon. As a result of the war, intellectuals of the Mongol Empire regarded Japanese swords as a threat. For example, Wang Yun, who served Kublai, and Zheng Si-xiao, a surviving retainer of the Song Dynasty, mentioned in their book that "Japanese swords are long and extremely sharp." They argued that the combination of a violent samurai and a Japanese sword was a threat.Yasuhiro Kawagoe 汎海小録の弘安の役記事について 軍事史学 第11巻第1号, pp.26-34. Kinseisha、1975,  

The Mongol invasions of Japan facilitated a change in the designs of Japanese swords. The swordsmiths of the Sōshū school represented by Masamune studied tachi that were broken or bent in battle, developed new production methods, and created innovative tachi. They forged the blade using a combination of soft and hard steel to optimize the temperature and timing of the heating and cooling of the blade, resulting in a lighter but more robust blade. They made the curve of the blade more gentle, lengthened the tip linearly, widened the width from the cutting edge to the opposite side of the blade, and thinned the cross section to improve the penetration and cutting ability of the blade.

Gallery

 Popular culture 
 The Mongol Invasions expansion pack of the video game Shogun: Total War features an alternate timeline where the Mongols successfully set foot on the Mainland Island of Japan. The player can play either as a Mongol invader or as Japan.
 The video game Ghost of Tsushima'' takes place during the Mongol invasion of 1274, led by the fictional cousin of Kublai, Khotun Khan.

See also
Mongol invasion of Java
Genkō Bōrui
Korea under Yuan rule
Battle of Khalkin Gol - Failed Japanese attempt to invade Mongolia in 1939
Mongol invasions of Sakhalin
Mongolians in Japan

References

Footnotes

Citations

Sources

13th-century conflicts
Japan
Wars involving Japan
Wars involving Imperial China
Wars involving Goryeo
Anti-Korean sentiment in Japan
Wars involving the Yuan dynasty
Goryeo
1270s in Japan
1274 in Asia
1280s in Japan
1281 in Asia
Japan
Invasions of Japan
1274 in the Mongol Empire
1281 in the Mongol Empire
Japan–Mongolia relations
Kublai Khan